The Chemnitz is a river in Saxony, Germany, a right tributary of the Zwickauer Mulde. It gave name to the city of Chemnitz, where it is formed by the smaller rivers Zwönitz and Würschnitz.

Gallery

See also 

List of rivers of Saxony

Rivers of Saxony
Chemnitz
Rivers of Germany